South Dakota Highway 73 (SD 73) is a state route that runs across western South Dakota. It begins at the Nebraska border north of Merriman, Nebraska, as a continuation of Nebraska Highway 61. It runs to the North Dakota border, where it continues as North Dakota Highway 49.

History
When designated in the 1920s, South Dakota 73 only consisted of the segment from Faith (U.S. Route 212) to Lemmon (U.S. Route 12).  The remainder of the route was unnumbered.

Around 1935, SD 73 was extended south from Faith, absorbing what had been a portion of South Dakota Highway 24 to near Plainview, then southeast via a new route to Philip.  From there, it was concurrent with U.S. Highway 16 to Kadoka then southward along what had been South Dakota Highway 63.  It continued south to the Nebraska border south of Martin, after sharing an alignment with U.S. Highway 18.  Except for minor route straightening and a new concurrency with Interstate 90, this route has not changed since.

Around 1979, the northern terminus was extended east along U.S. 12 to Thunder Hawk, where it met up with a new road to link with ND 49.

Major intersections

References

External links

 South Dakota Highways Page: Highways 61-100

073
Transportation in Bennett County, South Dakota
Transportation in Jackson County, South Dakota
Transportation in Haakon County, South Dakota
Transportation in Ziebach County, South Dakota
Transportation in Meade County, South Dakota
Transportation in Perkins County, South Dakota
Transportation in Corson County, South Dakota